The Army Reserve's 66th Cavalry Division was created from the perceived need for additional cavalry units. It numbered in succession of the Regular Army Divisions, which were not all active at its creation. Going into World War II, the U.S. Army Cavalry contained three Regular, four National Guard, and six organized reserve cavalry divisions as well as one independent cavalry brigade, the 56th from Texas.

Organization
Headquarters & Headquarters Troop
161st Brigade
321st Cavalry Regiment 
322nd Cavalry Regiment 
162nd Brigade
323rd Cavalry Regiment 
324th Cavalry Regiment 
866th Field Artillery Regiment
466th Tank Company
66th Signal Troop
586th Ordnance Company
466th Quartermaster Squadron
466th Armored Car Squadron
406th Engineer Squadron
366th Medical Squadron

Final Organization as of November 1940

Stationing
The 66th Cavalry Division was dispersed across the United States.  The division was primarily composed of personnel from Nebraska, Missouri, Utah, and North Dakota.

See also
United States Army branch insignia
List of armored and cavalry regiments of the United States Army

References
Formations of the United States Army
"Cavalry Regiments of the U.S. Army" by James A. Sawicki, Wyvern Publications 1985 pp375-379
ARMOR-CAVALRY, Part I: Regular Army and Army Reserve by Mary Lee Stubbs and Stanley Russell Connor, US Government Printing Office 1969
MANEUVER AND FIREPOWER THE EVOLUTION OF DIVISIONS AND SEPARATE BRIGADES by John B. Wilson CENTER OF MILITARY HISTORY, UNITED STATES ARMY, WASHINGTON, D. C., 1998

External links
The Ronald Reagan library at the University of Texas
Military Service of Ronald Reagan
Colonel Julien Gaujot served as Chief of Staff for the Division prior to his retirement on September 30, 1934

66